Pavel Dõmov (born 31 December 1993) is an Estonian professional footballer who plays as a midfielder for Estonian Meistriliiga club TJK Legion.

Club career

FC Flora
Dõmov joined FC Flora on 1 January 2019, after signing for the club on 14 December 2018 until the end of 2020.

International career
Dõmov started his international youth career in 2011 with the under-19 team. He made his international debut for Estonia on 19 November 2016, in a 1–1 away draw against Saint Kitts and Nevis in a friendly.

Honours

Club
Infonet
Meistriliiga: 2016
Estonian Cup: 2016–17
Estonian Supercup: 2017

Flora
Meistriliiga: 2019

References

External links

1993 births
Living people
Footballers from Tallinn
Estonian footballers
Association football midfielders
Estonian people of Russian descent
Esiliiga players
Meistriliiga players
FCI Tallinn players
FCI Levadia Tallinn players
FC Flora players
Paide Linnameeskond players
Estonia youth international footballers
Estonia international footballers
Tallinna JK Legion players